The New Zealand Warriors (formerly Auckland Warriors) are a professional rugby league club in the National Rugby League (NRL), the premier rugby league football competition in Australasia.

Based in Auckland the Warriors were admitted to the Australian Rugby League (ARL) competition in 1995, a predecessor of the current NRL competition. Below is a list of individual and team records set since the clubs introduction.

Individual records

* indicates player still active.

Player of the year

Most First Grade Games
301, Simon Mannering (2005–2018)
261, Stacey Jones (1995–2005, 2009)
226, Manu Vatuvei (2004–2017)
212, Ben Matulino (2008–2017)
195, Logan Swann (1997–2003, 2007–2008)
188, Jacob Lillyman (2009–2017)
185, Lance Hohaia (2002–2011)
175, Shaun Johnson* (2011–2018, 2022–)
173, Sam Rapira (2006–2015)
170, Awen Guttenbeil (1996–2006)

Most Tries For Club
152, Manu Vatuvei (2004–2017)
77, Stacey Jones (1995–2005, 2009)
64, Shaun Johnson* (2011–2018, 2022–)
63, Simon Mannering (2005–2018)
61, David Fusitu'a (2014–2021)
60, Francis Meli (1999–2005)
57, Clinton Toopi (1999–2006)
57, Lance Hohaia (2002–2011)
54, Jerome Ropati (2003–2014)
46, Solomone Kata (2015–2019)

Most tries in a season

Most Points For Club
927 (64 tries, 328 goals, 15 field goals), Shaun Johnson* (2011–2018, 2022–)
674 (77 tries, 176 goals, 14 field goals), Stacey Jones (1995–2005, 2009)
608 (152 tries), Manu Vatuvei (2004–2017)
547 (24 tries, 222 goals, 7 field goals), James Maloney (2010–2012)
439 (12 tries, 195 goals, 1 field goal), Ivan Cleary (2000–2002)
357 (57 tries, 64 goals, 1 field goal), Lance Hohaia (2002–2011)

Most points in a season

Most points in a match

Top try scorers

Club records

Highest home game attendance

32,174 vs the Illawarra Steelers at Ericsson Stadium in Round 6 of the 1995 ARL season.

Biggest wins

Biggest losses

Kept opposition to nil

Kept to nil

Most consecutive wins

Most consecutive losses

Most consecutive home wins

Most consecutive away wins

Most consecutive home losses

Most consecutive away losses

Biggest comeback
Recovered from a 21-point deficit.
 Trailed to Canberra 31–10 after 51 minutes to win 34–31 at GIO Stadium on 27 March 2021

Recovered from a 20-point deficit.
 Trailed to Newcastle 20–0 after 39 minutes to win 30–26 at EnergyAustralia Stadium on 17 April 2005

Recovered from a 16-point deficit.
Trailed  to Canterbury 24-8 after 75 minutes to draw 24 all at Westpac Stadium on 7 April 2001

Worst collapse
Surrendered a 26-point lead.
 Led Penrith 32–6 after 59 minutes to draw 32–32 at CUA Stadium on 1 August 2009

Surrendered a 22-point lead.
 Led Penrith 28–6 after 46 minutes to lose 36–28 at Pepper Stadium on 13 May 2017

Surrendered a 16-point lead (three times).
 Led Newcastle 16–0 after 34 minutes to lose 36–26 at Mt Smart Stadium on 16 March 2003
 Led Canterbury 16–0 after 21 minutes to lose 22–18 (in extra-time) at ANZ Stadium on 9 July 2006
 Led Canberra 22-6 after 46 minutes to lose 42-22 Mt Smart Stadium on 2 September 2012

Golden point record
Played 19: Won 6, Lost 9, Drawn 4
 Won 31–30 vs South Sydney Rabbitohs, Round 16, 2003
 Lost 26–28 vs North Queensland Cowboys, Round 15, 2004
 Lost 29–30 vs Canberra Raiders, Round 20, 2004
 Lost 18–22 vs Canterbury Bulldogs, Round 18, 2006
 Draw 31–31 vs Sydney Roosters, Round 21, 2007
 Won 17–16 vs Sydney Roosters, Round 6, 2009
 Draw 14–14 vs Melbourne Storm, Round 7, 2009
 Draw 32–32 vs Penrith Panthers, Round 21, 2009
 Won 17–13 vs Parramatta Eels, Round 10, 2015
 Won 32–28 vs Sydney Roosters, Round 5, 2016
 Lost 18–19 vs Cronulla Sharks, Round 16, 2016
 Lost 14–15 vs Manly Sea Eagles, Round 19, 2016
 Lost 22–26 vs Canberra Raiders, Round 20, 2016
 Won 20–16 vs Penrith Panthers, Round 21, 2016
 Lost 21–22 vs Manly Sea Eagles, Round 25, 2017
 Lost 18-19 vs Penrith Panthers, 2019, Round 15
 Draw 18-18 vs Brisbane Broncos, 2019, Round 17
 Lost 18-19 vs St George Illawarra Dragons, 2021, Round 16
 Won 25-24 vs North Queensland Cowboys, 2022, Round 5

All time premiership record 1995-2018
Note:
18 of those 588 games were in the finals (8 wins) (10 losses)

References

Records
National Rugby League lists
New Zealand rugby league lists
Rugby league records and statistics